Woodrow Wilson "Woody" Bledsoe (November 12, 1921 – October 4, 1995) was an American mathematician, computer scientist, and prominent educator. He is one of the founders of artificial intelligence (AI), making early contributions in pattern recognition and automated theorem proving. He continued to make significant contributions to AI throughout his long career.

Beginning in 1966, he worked at the department of mathematics and computer science of the University of Texas at Austin, holding the Peter O'Donnell Jr. Centennial Chair in Computing Science starting in 1987.

Bledsoe joined the Church of Jesus Christ of Latter-day Saints as an adult, and served in the church as a bishop, counselor to the Stake presidency, and Stake patriarch. He also served as a leader in the Boy Scouts of America. Bledsoe died on October 4, 1995 of amyotrophic lateral sclerosis, more commonly known as ALS or Lou Gehrig's disease.

Further reading

Selected publications

References

External links
 
 W.W. Bledsoe's publications at DBLP
 W.W. Bledsoe at the chess programming wiki

1921 births
1995 deaths
20th-century American mathematicians
American computer scientists
20th-century American educators
American leaders of the Church of Jesus Christ of Latter-day Saints
Artificial intelligence researchers
Converts to Mormonism
Patriarchs (LDS Church)
People from Maysville, Oklahoma
University of Texas at Austin faculty
Mathematicians from Oklahoma
Latter Day Saints from Oklahoma
Latter Day Saints from Texas
Presidents of the Association for the Advancement of Artificial Intelligence